Artrage is Western Australia's longest-running charitable not-for-profit arts organisation. Based in Perth, it originated as an alternative to the Perth International Arts Festival in 1983. Since then, Artrage has evolved into a production company supporting contemporary culture in Western Australia, and produces Rooftop Movies, Girls School, and the annual multi-arts fringe festival Fringe World.

References

External links

Culture in Perth, Western Australia
Arts organisations based in Australia
Arts organizations established in 1983